Ezere Manor, also called Lielezere Manor, is a manor house in the historical region of Courland, in western Latvia near the border with Lithuania.  Ezere Manor house, constructed in 18th-19th centuries, is an architectural monument of national importance.

History 
Original Ezere manor house  (Lielezer Manor; Groß-Essern; Essern) was built in 1750s by von Bernewitz noble family. Later it has been remodeled several times by a series of owners. Since 1922 the building has housed the Ezere school. It was a 6-year primary school at that time.
Capitulation of Army Group Courland was accepted here by Soviet General Ivan Bagramyan on 9 May 1945.

Since 1952 manor house has been operating as an Ezere secondary school. In 1963, the school was expanded to include a primary school, a music class and a gym.

As of September 1, 2016, by the decision of the meeting of the deputies of Saldus District Council on February 25, the Ezere Secondary School was reorganized into an elementary school.

See also
List of palaces and manor houses in Latvia

References

External links

Manor houses in Latvia
Saldus Municipality